The Bavarian Peasants' League (or BB) was an agrarian political party in Bavaria, Germany, from 1893 to 1933. It has also been known in English as the Bavarian Farmers' League.

The BB represented the farming interests in the Landtag of Bavaria and in the German Reichstag.

Further reading
 

Political parties established in 1870
Political parties disestablished in 1933
Agrarian parties in Germany
Liberal parties in Germany
Politics of Bavaria
Defunct regional parties in Germany
1870 establishments in Bavaria
1933 disestablishments in Germany
Bavarian nationalism